"Naatu Naatu" is an Indian Telugu-language song composed by M. M. Keeravani, with lyrics by Chandrabose and recorded by Rahul Sipligunj and Kaala Bhairava for the soundtrack album of the 2022 Indian film RRR. It was released on 10 November 2021 (released on YouTube as a lyrical video song) as the second single from the album, through Lahari Music and T-Series. The full video song, featuring visuals directly from the film, was released on 11 April 2022 on YouTube. 

The song was also released in Hindi as "Naacho Naacho", in Tamil as "Naattu Koothu", in Kannada as "Halli Naatu" and in Malayalam as "Karinthol". The hook step dance involving N. T. Rama Rao Jr. and Ram Charanthe lead actors of RRRbecame popular. "Naatu Naatu" became the first song from an Indian film to win Best Original Song honours at the Academy Awards, and at the Golden Globe Awards, as well as the first song from an Asian film to win the former.

Background and recording 
The entire process of producing the song took over 19 months. Keeravani composed 10 to 20 different tunes based on that particular point in the script. Later, the team finalized this particular tune based on a voting process from their inner circle.

Composition and lyrics 

The Telugu word naatu (nāṭu) variously translates to 'native', 'local', 'countryside', 'raw and rustic', 'ethnic'. Chandrabose wrote the lyrics based on his childhood memories. According to Chandrabose, he wrote 90% of the song in half a day but it took 1.7 years to write the remaining 10%.

The composer Keeravani likened the sound to the traditional beats of folk songs in Indian villages. Keeravani used duffs, an Indian skin drum for the instrumentation and added in mandolins for the melody. The song features a  beat popular in South Indian music.

The song was also released in Hindi as "Naacho Naacho", in Tamil as "Naattu Koothu", in Kannada as "Halli Naatu" and in Malayalam as "Karinthol". It was released on 10 November 2021 (released on YouTube as a lyrical video song) as the second single from the album, through Lahari Music and T-Series. The full video song, featuring visuals directly from the film, was released on 11 April 2022 on YouTube.

Critical reception
Onmanorama praised the song and stated, "The mood-lifting beats and the perkiest actors dancing to those beats is just what the fans have been waiting for, ever since the makers announced the magnum opus." A. Kameshwari of The Indian Express wrote "Naatu Naatu offer double the fun as the two actors perform together on screen and create an insane energy, which makes you want to dance too. The RRR song can sure be titled as the best mass track of the year." A review from Mirchi9 criticized the song itself for being ordinary, calling it as "an old-school, serviceable number". However, they praised Rama Rao and Charan's choreography and rapport, calling it as a "visual feast". Matt Patches of Polygon named the musical sequence in the film as one of the best movie scenes of 2022.

Alison Herman of The Ringer complimented the idea of the song and wrote "Naatu Naatu is something different: a musical performance that moves the story forward in a movie that isn't primarily musical, challenging the binary of "musical" versus "not" and making the song itself more integral to the film", comparing it with the Academy Award for Best Original Song nominees. Analyzing the song, Sudhir Srinivasan of The New Indian Express stated: "The 274 seconds of the song inspire a rare loss of inhibition; they urge you to let go, give in, trust, and just dance. Worry later, dance now. For those seconds, everyone—the oppressive white man, the meek princess, the Indian rebels—is equal in dance and joy". Firstpost Ganesh Aaglave praised Rahul Sipligunj and Kaala Bhairava's vocals.

Accolades

Music video

Background and production 

RRR director Rajamouli conceived "Naatu Naatu" as a kind of fight sequence in which the Indian duo outdance their British counterparts. He also used the song as a foreshadowing for the climax sequence. "I think the biggest achievement for me was incorporating how the song comes into the film, without breaking the narrative," he noted. Rajamouli described the sequence as "the story behind the story" and is like a short film of its own with different sub-plots.

Prem Rakshith choreographed the dance sequences. Rajamouli wanted steps "that would look great with two people doing it together, but not so complicated that no-one could do it." Rakshith choreographed 110 moves for the hook step.

"Naatu Naatu" was shot in August 2021 in Ukraine as a part of the final leg of shooting of RRR. Filming took place at the Mariinskyi Palace, the official residence of the president of Ukraine in Kyiv, a few months before the onset of the Russian invasion of Ukraine. The song picturization took 15 days. The music video featured about 50 dancers and 300 to 400 extras.

Synopsis 
The music video is a direct clip from a scene in RRR, which features Ram (Ram Charan) and Bheem (Rama Rao) singing the lyrics and out-dancing the rich British men at a fancy British party, encouraged by Bheem's love interest Jenny (Olivia Morris). By the song's climax, Ram and Bheem ignite a dance battle between themselves and the British men, who each fall down one by one as they fail to keep up; and despite being cheered for, Ram pretends to injure his leg and falls over to allow Bheem to win the battle and impress Jenny.

Reception 
Within 24 hours of its release, the song crossed over 17 million views in Telugu (becoming the most-viewed Telugu song), and 35 million views in all five languages on YouTube. It also became the fastest Telugu song to cross 1 million likes, In February 2022, the song crossed over 200 million views in all languages.

Credits and personnel 
Credits adapted from YouTube.
 M. M. Keeravani composer
 Chandrabose lyricist
 Rahul Sipligunj vocal
 Kaala Bhairavavocal
 Prem Rakshith Choreographer 
 G. Jeevan Babu mix engineer, mastering engineer, programmer
 Siddharth S  programmer

Charts

Impact 
The song received positive reception from audiences, praising the music. The hook step, performed by Jr NTR and Ram Charan, went viral on social media. Charan and Rama Rao often recreated the viral portion of the dance in the film's promotions, as did director Rajamouli at the film's success party with encouragement from Rama Rao.

In an article, Brenda Haas of Deutsche Welle referred the song as a "global sensation". She further opined and wrote that, "the song's international popularity also underscores the fact that language is no barrier to enjoying music across borders".

At Edison, New Jersey in 2023, large number of Tesla cars were assembled to have a show of light & sound, set to the music of this song

See also
 List of Indian winners and nominees of the Golden Globe Awards

Notes

References

External links
 
 

2021 songs
Telugu film songs
Telugu-language songs
Songs with music by M. M. Keeravani
Songs with lyrics by Chandrabose (lyricist)
Songs written for films
Best Original Song Golden Globe winning songs
T-Series (company) singles
Best Original Song Academy Award-winning songs